Tanaecia cibaritis, the Andaman viscount, is a species of nymphalid butterfly found in the Andaman Islands in the Indian Ocean.

Description

Its upperside is brown and has a prominent white band bordered by a black spots. The underside is pale green. The males differ from the females having a narrower white band on the posterior wing and underside is bordered on both sides with black spots. This is the largest in the trigerta species group.

Ecology
It is usually found in moist forested regions, along the forest paths and clearings.

Host plants
The known host plants include Krukoviella obovata.

References

	

Tanaecia
Butterflies described in 1874
Butterflies of Asia
Taxa named by William Chapman Hewitson